Modaser Zekria (born 25 June 1990) is an Afghan international footballer who plays for Swedish club Newroz FC, as a midfielder.

Career
Born in Jalalabad, Zakaria has played club football in Sweden for Värmdö IF, Hammarby Talang FF, Enskede IK, Forssa BK, IK Brage, Boo FK, IFK Aspudden-Tellus and Newroz FC.

He earned two caps for the  Afghanistan national team in 2015.

References

1990 births
Living people
Afghan footballers
Afghanistan international footballers
Värmdö IF players
Hammarby Talang FF players
Enskede IK players
Forssa BK players
IK Brage players
Boo FK players
IFK Aspudden-Tellus players
Ettan Fotboll players
Division 2 (Swedish football) players
Division 3 (Swedish football) players
Association football midfielders
Afghan expatriate footballers
Afghan expatriate sportspeople in Sweden
Expatriate footballers in Sweden